The 2017 Citi Open was a tennis tournament played on outdoor hard courts. It was the 49th edition (for the men) and the 7th edition (for the women) of the Washington Open. The event is part of the ATP World Tour 500 series of the 2017 ATP World Tour, and of the WTA International tournaments of the 2017 WTA Tour. It took place at the William H.G. FitzGerald Tennis Center in Washington, D.C., United States, from July 31 to August 6, 2017.

Points and prize money

Point distribution

Prize money 

1 Qualifiers prize money is also the Round of 64 prize money
* per team

ATP singles main-draw entrants

Seeds

1 Rankings are as of July 24, 2017

Other entrants
The following players received wild cards into the main singles draw:
  Grigor Dimitrov
  Kei Nishikori
  Milos Raonic
  Tim Smyczek
  Tommy Paul

The following player received entry using a protected ranking:
  Dmitry Tursunov

The following players received entry from the singles qualifying draw:
  Sekou Bangoura 
  Alessandro Bega 
  Yuki Bhambri 
  Alexios Halebian 
  Edan Leshem 
  Ramkumar Ramanathan

The following player received entry as a lucky loser:
  Marc Polmans

Withdrawals
Before the tournament
  Dan Evans →replaced by  Ruben Bemelmans
  John Isner →replaced by  Marc Polmans
  Illya Marchenko →replaced by  Reilly Opelka
  Bernard Tomic →replaced by  Stefan Kozlov

ATP doubles main-draw entrants

Seeds

1 Rankings are as of July 24, 2017

Other entrants
The following pairs received wildcards into the doubles main draw:
  Rohan Bopanna /  Donald Young
  Nicholas Monroe /  Jack Sock

The following pair received entry from the doubles qualifying draw:
  James Cerretani /  Marc Polmans

WTA singles main-draw entrants

Seeds

1 Rankings are as of July 24, 2017

Other entrants
The following players received wild cards into the main singles draw:
  Bianca Andreescu
  Simona Halep
  Sloane Stephens

The following players received entry from the qualifying draw:
  Louisa Chirico 
  Valentini Grammatikopoulou 
  Jamie Loeb 
  Heather Watson

Withdrawals
Before the tournament
  Daria Kasatkina →replaced by  Patricia Maria Țig
  Yulia Putintseva →replaced by  Françoise Abanda
  Francesca Schiavone (entered Stanford tournament) →replaced by  Aryna Sabalenka
  Yaroslava Shvedova →replaced by  Mariana Duque Mariño
  Samantha Stosur →replaced by  Jana Čepelová

WTA doubles main-draw entrants

Seeds

1 Rankings are as of July 24, 2017

Other entrants
The following pair received a wildcard into the doubles main draw:
  Skylar Morton /  Alana Smith

Finals

Men's singles

  Alexander Zverev defeated  Kevin Anderson 6–4, 6–4.

Women's singles

  Ekaterina Makarova defeated  Julia Görges 3–6, 7–6(7–2), 6–0.

Men's doubles

  Henri Kontinen /  John Peers defeated  Łukasz Kubot /  Marcelo Melo 7–6(7–5), 6–4

Women's doubles

  Shuko Aoyama /  Renata Voráčová defeated  Eugenie Bouchard /  Sloane Stephens, 6–3, 6–2

References

External links
Official website

2017 WTA Tour
2017
2017 in American tennis
2017 in sports in Washington, D.C.